Cornelius Eugene Lock (born December 12, 1978) is an American professional boxer and a former WBO–NABO featherweight champion.

Professional career
One of the highlights of Lock's career came on September 19, 2009 on the undercard to Floyd Mayweather, Jr. vs. Juan Manuel Marquez. Lock stopped then-undefeated Orlando Cruz to win the WBO–NABO featherweight title.

In August 2010, Cornelius lost to undefeated Mikey García in an eliminator for the IBF featherweight world title.

Lock is managed by Brian Cohen.

References

External links

Boxers from Detroit
Lightweight boxers
1978 births
Living people
American male boxers
Boxers managed by Brian Cohen